Yusefabad-e Bam (also Romanized as Yūsefābād-e Bam; also known as Bam) is a village in Dastgerdan Rural District, Dastgerdan District, Tabas County, South Khorasan Province, Iran. At the 2006 census, its population was 135, in 49 families.

References 

Populated places in Tabas County